Objectified is a feature-length documentary film examining the role of everyday non-living objects, and the people who design them, in our daily lives. The film is directed by Gary Hustwit. Objectified premiered at the South By Southwest Festival on March 14, 2009.

According to Swiss Dots Production, the film is the second part of the three-film series Design Trilogy, the first being Helvetica about the famous typeface, and the third and final film being the documentary Urbanized.

Appearing characters
 Paola Antonelli - Design Curator, Museum of Modern Art (New York)
 Chris Bangle - Former Design Director, BMW Group (Munich)
 Ronan & Erwan Bouroullec - Designers (Paris)
 Andrew Blauvelt - Design Curator, Walker Art Center
 Tim Brown - CEO, IDEO
 Anthony Dunne - Designer (London)
 Agnete Enga - Senior Industrial Designer, Smart Design
 Dan Formosa - Design & Research, Smart Design (New York)
 Naoto Fukasawa - Designer (Tokyo)
 Jonathan Ive - Chief Design Officer, Apple (Cupertino)
 Hella Jongerius - Designer (Rotterdam)
 David M. Kelley - Founder & Chairman, IDEO
 Bill Moggridge - Co-founder IDEO
 Marc Newson - Designer (London/Paris)
 Fiona Raby - Designer (London)
 Dieter Rams - Former Design Director, Braun (Kronberg, Germany)
 Karim Rashid - Designer (New York)
 Alice Rawsthorn - Design Editor, International Herald Tribune
 Amber Shonts - Model
 Davin Stowell - CEO & Founder, Smart Design
 Jane Fulton Suri - IDEO
 Rob Walker - New York Times Magazine

References

External links 

 
 
 
 Online film review

2009 films
American documentary films
British documentary films
American independent films
Industrial design
Documentary films about the visual arts
Films directed by Gary Hustwit
2009 documentary films
2000s English-language films
2000s American films
2000s British films